Gregory MacIsaac (born August 17, 1945) is a Canadian politician. He represented the electoral district of Richmond in the Nova Scotia House of Assembly from 1981 to 1988. He was a member of the Progressive Conservative Party of Nova Scotia.

Born in 1945, at Glace Bay, Nova Scotia, MacIsaac was educated at the Nova Scotia Institute of Technology, St. Francis Xavier University, and Dalhousie University. MacIsaac entered provincial politics in the 1981 election, defeating Liberal incumbent John E. LeBrun by 352 votes in the Richmond riding. He was re-elected in the 1984 election, defeating Liberal Richie Mann by 472 votes. On February 5, 1988, MacIsaac was found guilty of nine counts of fraud, forgery and using forged receipts to justify more than $10,000 in claims on his MLA expense accounts, and was kicked out of the Progressive Conservative caucus. On February 17, 1988, MacIssac announced he was resigning as MLA effective February 24. On March 30, 1988, MacIsaac was sentenced to one year in jail.

References

1945 births
Living people
Progressive Conservative Association of Nova Scotia MLAs
Dalhousie University alumni
People from Glace Bay
People from Richmond County, Nova Scotia
St. Francis Xavier University alumni